Sussex 2 is an English level 10 Rugby Union League. It is run by the Sussex Rugby Football Union and contains teams predominantly from West Sussex. The twelve teams play home and away matches from September through to April.  Promoted teams move up to Sussex 1 and demoted teams fall to Sussex 3.  Up until 2003-04 the league was known as Sussex 2 which was abolished at the end of that season. Sussex Canterbury Jack Intermediate emerged in 2010-11 as the second-tier competition for Sussex with a large number of 2nd, 3rd and 4th teams taking part.  The division name changed to Sussex Canterbury Jack Division 2 for the 2016–17 season.  A further name change resulted in Sussex Canterbury Jack 2 becoming Sussex 2 Armada Ale for the 2017–18 season.

Original teams
When league rugby began in 1987 this division contained the following teams:

Azurians
British Caledonian
Heathfield & Waldron
Hellingly
Plumpton
St. Francis
Uckfield
University of Sussex

Sussex 2 honours

Sussex 2 (1987–1993)

The original Sussex 2 was a tier 9 league with promotion up to Sussex 1 and relegation down to Sussex 3 until that division was abolished at the end of the 1991–92 season.

Sussex 2 (1993–1996)

The creation of National 5 South meant that Sussex 2 dropped from a tier 9 league to a tier 10 league for the years that National 5 South was active.  Promotion was to Sussex 1, and relegation was to Sussex 3, which was reinstated for the 1994–95 season after a two-year absence.

Sussex 2 (1996–2000)

The cancellation of National 5 South at the end of the 1995–96 season meant that Sussex 2 reverted to being a tier 9 league.  Promotion and relegation continued to Sussex 1 and Sussex 3 respectively.

Sussex 2: East / West (2000–2002)

Restructuring of the London & South East leagues ahead of the 2000–01 saw the cancellation of Sussex 3 for the second time, and Sussex 2 divided into two regional divisions - Sussex 2 East and Sussex 2 West.  Additionally, both regional divisions dropped to tier 10 leagues due to the introduction of London 4 South East.  Promotion continued to Sussex 1 and there was no longer relegation.

Sussex 2 (2002–2004)

Sussex 2 was re-merged back into a single division ahead of the 2002–03 season, remaining at tier 10 of the league system.  Promotion was to Sussex 1 and relegation to Sussex 3, which returned after an absence of two seasons.  Sussex 2 was abolished at the end of the 2003–04 season.

Sussex Canterbury Jack Intermediate (2010–2015)

Sussex 2 was reintroduced for the 2010–11 season as Sussex Canterbury Jack Intermediate.  It was a tier 10 league with promotion up to Sussex 1 and relegation to either Sussex Asahi 2 East or Sussex Oranjeboom 2 West.

Sussex 2 (2015–present)

Sussex Canterbury Jack Intermediate was renamed to Sussex 2 for the 2015–16 season.  It remained a tier 10 league with promotion to Sussex 1, while relegation was now to Sussex Oranjeboom 3.

Number of league titles

BA Wingspan (3)
Pulborough (3)
St. Francis (3)
Burgess Hill (2)
Seaford (2)
Bognor II (1)
Chichester III (1)
Chichester IHE (1)
Ditchling (1)
East Grinstead (1)
Hastings & Bexhill (1)
Haywards Heath II (1)
Heathfield & Waldron (1)
Hove IV (1)
Midhurst (1)
Plumpton (1)
Rye (1)
St. Jacques (1)
Uckfield (1)
Worthing Senior I (1)

Notes

See also
London & SE Division RFU
Sussex RFU
English rugby union system
Rugby union in England

References

External links
Sussex Canterbury Jack Intermediate Results at Sussex Rugby Football Union

Rugby union leagues in England
Rugby union in Sussex